Ardently Love is the seventh album by Hins Cheung, and was released on August 16, 2007. The first edition contains 10 tracks. The second edition contains a bonus DVD containing 12 various karaoke songs.

Track listing
 酷愛 (Ardently Love)
 追風箏的孩子 (Kid Chasing Kite)
 迷失表參道 (Lost in Drive)
 感情用事 (Emotional)
 男孩最痛 (What Hurts a Man)
 我的天 (My God)
 悔過詩 (Repentance Poetry)
 悲劇人物 (Tragedy Character)
 遙吻 (Kiss)
 放榜 (Results Released)

External links
Album Information

2007 albums
Hins Cheung albums